Hermodike II has been attributed with inventing coinage by Aristotle. Other historians have translated the name as Hermodice, Damodice or Demodike as translated by Julius Pollux. 

Hermodike II was the daughter of a dynastic Agamemnon of Cyme and married to the third dynastic King Midas, possibly a literary reference to Alyattes of Lydia, in the 6th century BC.  She was named after Hermodike I who has been attributed with inventing the Greek written script.

Numismatic history 
Coinage revolutionised trade and commerce, creating market economics, see History of coins.

The 8th-century BC King Midas likely Gyges of Lydia pre-dates coinage. Coins were not invented until 610 BC by King Alyattes (610–560 BC), Gyges' great grandson.  The Lydian Lion coin directly preceded ancient Greek coinage, through which Rome begot all Western coinage.  Yet, although the Lydian Lion was minted by Alyattes for use as a "nobleman's tax-token", "it took some time before ancient coins were used for everyday commerce and trade. Even the smallest-denomination electrum coins, perhaps worth about a day's subsistence, would have been too valuable for buying a loaf of bread."  The Greeks of Cyme changed the Lydian "tax-token" into a means of transaction for the common man and woman.  Stamped coins avoided weighing silver for small transactions because the symbol on the hemiobol was enough to verify its value.

However, academics state that Aristotle and Pollux, though ancient commentators, were not historians and so their unsubstantiated opinions may be misleading. Given the technological and chronological link to minting, Hermodike II may have been married to Alyattes of Lydia, who had more than one wife, and who amassed great wealth, like Midas, by sourcing the electrum for his coins from Midas’ fabled river Pactolus.  

Hermodike II is attributed to the global spread of coinage. The coins from Cyme, when first circulated around 600–550 BCE, utilised the symbol of the horse. The symbol of the Trojan Horse tied the dynasty of Agamemnon with the glory of the original Agamemnon through the Greek victory over Troy.

Alyattes created coinage - to use a token currency, where the value is guaranteed by the state and not by the value of the metal used in the coins - and the role of Hermodike II was to communicate that technology and philosophy into Greek society as per D. Macpherson's observation,

Hermodike II was the royal link between Lydia and Aeolia – the conduit of knowledge and the person who influenced the Greeks into adopting the invention of coins. Ancient Greek market economics subsequently influenced the rest of the western world.

References 

Ancient Greeks
Coins of ancient Greece